Angus Neil McCallum (9 April 1892 – 7 December 1946) was a Canadian farmer and politician. McCallum was a Liberal party member of the House of Commons of Canada. He was born in Sudbury, Ontario and became a farmer.

McCallum attended high school at Sydenham then Queen's University where he earned a Bachelor of Science degree.

He was acclaimed to Parliament at the Frontenac—Addington riding in a by-election on 1 November 1937. After serving the remainder of the 18th Canadian Parliament, McCallum was defeated by Wilbert Ross Aylesworth of the National Government (Conservative) party.

References

External links
 

1892 births
1946 deaths
Canadian farmers
Liberal Party of Canada MPs
Members of the House of Commons of Canada from Ontario
Queen's University at Kingston alumni
People from Frontenac County
Politicians from Greater Sudbury